Joshua J. Stonko (born 1992/1993) is an American politician who is currently a member of the Maryland House of Delegates for District 42C in Carroll County, Maryland. He was previously a candidate for District 5 of the Maryland House of Delegates in 2014 and 2015.

Background
Stonko graduated from the University of Maryland, College Park with a Bachelor of Arts degree in economics in 2014, and later attended the University of Maryland Global Campus, where he earned a Bachelor of Science degree in computer science. After graduating, he worked for PNC Bank from 2015 to 2022, and for JPMorgan Chase since 2022.

In the legislature
Stonko was sworn into the Maryland House of Delegates on January 11, 2023. He is a member of the House Appropriations Committee.

Electoral history

References

External links
 

21st-century American politicians
1990s births
Living people
People from Hampstead, Maryland
Republican Party members of the Maryland House of Delegates
University of Maryland, College Park alumni
University of Maryland Global Campus alumni

Year of birth uncertain